Carpatho-Ukraine or Carpathian Ukraine was an autonomous region within the Second Czechoslovak Republic, created in December 1938 by renaming Subcarpathian Rus' whose full administrative and political autonomy was confirmed by the Constitutional law of 22 November 1938. 20 years earlier, the region which had historically belonged to Hungary, was detached from Kingdom of Hungary and attached to the newly created Czechoslovakia by the Treaty of Trianon in 1920, and Hungary had sought a nonviolent way to restore its historical borders and the revision of the Treaty of Trianon. On 2 November 1938, the First Vienna Award separated territories from Czechoslovakia, including the southern Carpathian Rus' that were mostly Hungarian-populated and returned them to Hungary. After the breakup of the Second Czechoslovak Republic, Carpatho-Ukraine proclaimed an independent republic on 15 March 1939, headed by president Avgustyn Voloshyn, who appealed to Hitler for recognition and support. Nazi Germany did not reply, and the short-lived state was invaded by the Kingdom of Hungary, crushing all local resistance by 18 March 1939.

The region remained under Hungarian control until the end of World War II in Europe, after which it was occupied and annexed by the Soviet Union. The territory is now administered as the Ukrainian Zakarpattia Oblast.

History

Political autonomy 
Soon after the implementation of the Munich Agreement, signed of 30 September 1938, by which Czechoslovakia lost much of its border region to Nazi Germany, a series of political reforms were initiated, leading to creation of the Second Czechoslovak Republic, consisting of three autonomous political entities, including autonomous Slovakia, and autonomous Subcarpathian Rus' (Rusyn: Підкарпатьска Русь). First local Government of autonomous Subcarpathian Rus' was appointed on 11 October 1938, headed by prime-minister Andrej Bródy. In following days, a crisis occurred between two local fractions, pro-Rusyn and pro-Ukrainian, leading to the resignation of Bródy's government on 26 October. New regional government, headed by Avgustyn Voloshyn, adopted a pro-Ukrainian course and initiated the change of regional name, from Subcarpathian Rus''' to Carpathian Ukraine.

That proposal opened a new political debate. On 22 November 1938, authorities of the Second Czechoslovak Republic decided to adopt the Constitutional Law on the Autonomy of Subcarpathian Rus' (Czech: Ústavní zákon o autonomii Podkarpatské Rusi), officially reaffirming the self-determination rights of the Rusyn people (preamble), and also confirming full administrative and political autonomy of Subcarpathian Rus', with its own assembly and government. Such terminology was seen as a demonstration of state support for the pro-Rusyn fraction, and on 30 December 1938, local government responded by issuing a provisional decree that proclaimed the change of regional name to Carpathian Ukraine. That led to the creation of a particular terminological duality. In constitutional system of the Second Czechoslovak Republic the region continued to be formally known as the Subcarpathian Rus', while local institutions continued to promote the use of term Carpathian Ukraine.

 Political crisis 
In late September 1938, Hungary was ready to mobilize between 200,000 and 350,000 men on the Czechoslovak borders in case the Czechoslovak question could not be solved on diplomatic level, in favor of the Hungarian territorial claims. After the Munich Agreement the Hungarian Army had remained poised threateningly on the Czechoslovak border. They reportedly had artillery ammunition for only 36 hours of operations, and were clearly engaged in a bluff, but it was a bluff the Germans had encouraged, and one that they would have been obliged to support militarily if the much larger, better trained and better equipped Czechoslovak Army chose to fight. The Czechoslovak army had built 2,000 small concrete emplacements along the border in places where rivers did not serve as natural obstacles.

The Hungarian minister of the interior, Miklós Kozma, had been born in Subcarpathia, and in mid-1938 his ministry armed the Rongyos Gárda ('Ragged Guard'), which began to infiltrate guerillas along the southern borders of Czechoslovakia; into Slovakia and Subcarpathia. The situation was now verging on open war, which might set the whole of Europe ablaze again. The appendix of the Munich Agreement concluded Czechoslovakia and Hungary should arrange their disputes by mutual negotiations, which could not achieve a final agreement, so the Hungarian and the Czechoslovak governments accepted the German-Italian Arbitration of Vienna as France and the United Kingdom rejected participation of no interest. This led to the First Vienna Award.

On 2 November 1938, this found largely in favor of the Hungarians and obliged the Prague government to cede 11,833 km2 of Slovakia and Carpathian Ruthenia to Hungary. Not only did this transfer the homes of about 590,000 Hungarians to Hungary, but 290,000 Slovaks and 37,000 Rusyns as well. In addition, it cost Slovakia its second-largest city, Košice, and left the capital, Bratislava, vulnerable to further Hungarian pressure. As a consequence, the Slovak end of the Czechoslovak Army had to be reorganized. It had lost its natural defensive positions on the Danube River, almost the entire belt of fortifications along the Hungarian border and several major depots.

On 8 November 1938, the Slovak National Unity Party received 97.5 percent of the Slovak votes, and a one-party state was instituted. Slovak autonomy was formalized by the Prague parliament on 19 November, and to symbolize this new Slovak assertiveness, the country's name was then altered to Czecho-Slovakia. Carpatho-Ukraine was also given autonomy.

The Slovak national militia Hlinka Guard participated in these clashes. The ineffectiveness of the Prague government in protecting their interests stirred Slovak and Ukrainian nationalism further. On 6 January 1939 Czechoslovak troops ordered by general Lev Prchala performed a surprise attack on the city of Munkács (now Mukacheve), in which the Carpathian Sich were as well involved, but the Rongyos Gárda with the help of the local police pushed them back. After this incident Döme Sztójay, the Hungarian ambassador in Berlin transferred a message to the German government in case of the German occupation of the Czech lands and the declaration of Slovak independence Hungary will occupy the rest of Carpathian Ruthenia, regardless of German approval. On March 11, the German ambassador in Budapest outlined in the German Government's response if Hungary will maintain and uphold the economic contracts with Germany, respect the rights of the local Germans and would not persecute the members of the Volosin Cabinet, then in case of the proclamation of an independent Carpatho-Ukraine would be acquiescent regarding the Hungarian plans.

 Proclamation of Independence 
Slovak and Ukrainian nationalism grew more intense. On 10 March, the Hlinka Guard and Volksdeutsche demonstrated, demanding independence from Czecho-Slovakia. In the evening of 13 March, Slovak leader Jozef Tiso and Ďurčanský met Adolf Hitler, Joachim von Ribbentrop, and Generals Walther von Brauchitsch and Wilhelm Keitel in Berlin.

Hitler made it absolutely clear: Slovakia could either declare independence immediately and associate itself with the Reich, or he would allow the Hungarians to take over the country – whom Ribbentrop reported were massing at the border. During the afternoon and night of 14 March, the Slovak parliament proclaimed independence from Czecho-Slovakia, and at 05:00 on 15 March 1939, Hitler declared the unrest in Czecho-Slovakia to be a threat to German national security. He sent his troops into Bohemia and Moravia, meeting virtually no resistance.

Following the Slovak proclamation of independence on March 14 and the Nazis' seizure of Czech lands on 15 March, Carpatho-Ukraine declared its independence as the Republic of Carpatho-Ukraine, with the Reverend Avgustyn Voloshyn as head of state.. Voloshin was now supported by the population of Subcarpathia. The First Constitutional Law of Carpatho-Ukraine of 15 March 1939 defined the new country as follows:

 Carpatho-Ukraine is an independent state
 The name of the state is: Carpatho-Ukraine
 The state language of Carpatho-Ukraine is the Ukrainian language
 The colors of the national flag of the Carpatho-Ukraine are blue and yellow, blue on top and yellow on the bottom
 The state emblem of Carpatho-Ukraine is as follows: a bear on a red field on the sinister side, four blue and three yellow stripes on the dexter side, as well as the trident of Saint Volodymyr the Great
 The national anthem of Carpatho-Ukraine is "Ukraine has not perished"
 This act comes valid immediately after its promulgation

The proclaimed Carpatho-Ukrainian government was headed by President Avgustyn Voloshyn, Prime Minister Julian Révaý, Minister of Defence Stepan Klochurak, and Minister of Internal Affairs Yuriy Perevuznyk. The Slovak declaration of independence caused law and order to break down immediately. The Hungarians had learned that the Germans would not object to a Hungarian takeover of Carpatho-Ukraine on the same day.

Hungarian invasion

The Chief of General Staff of Hungary Henrik Werth was asking for at least a week to prepare for the invasion, instead the Royal Council gave him only 12 hours to occupy Carpathian Ruthenia before declaration of Slovak independence. Responsible for preparation to the assault was appointed chief of Munkacs garrison Lajos Béldi who commanded 1st Mountain Brigade, while Lieutenant General Ferenc Szombathelyi (commander of the 8th Corps in Kassa) was placed in charge of the Carpathian Group as an expeditionary force.

The available Hungarian forces consisted of an infantry regiment, two cavalry regiments, three infantry battalions on bicycles, one motorized battalion, two border guard battalions, one artillery battalion and two armored trains. These forces were counting for more than two World War II divisions. They were supported by Fiat CR.32 fighter aircraft amounting to one regiment. In addition to regular units, Hungarians were also aided by several irregular formations such as the Rongyos Gárda and black-shirt guards of István Fenczik, who has been accused earlier as a Magyaron by the Volosin-cabinet.A kivégzett, kárpátaljai lágerekben elhunyt magyar képviselők (1945-1949), dr. Dupka György, dr. Zubánics László, 2017, 

On 15 March 1939, the Hungarian Army regular troops invaded Carpatho-Ukraine and by nightfall reached Szolyva. The Carpatho-Ukrainian irregular troops, the Carpathian Sich, without additional support, were quickly routed. The greatest battle between the Hungarian army and several hundreds Ukrainian soldiers (armed with light machine guns, rifles, hand grenades and pistols) took place near Khust.  About 230 Ukrainians died in the battle.

Czecho-Slovak resistance in Carpatho-Ukraine was negligible, and the advancing Hungarian troops did not have to face a well-organized and centralized resistance. The Hungarian Army also had the advantage of the First Vienna Award, which made it possible for the Hungarians to take possession of the area where the Czechs built their permanent fortifications against Hungary.

On 16 March 1939, Hungary formally annexed the territory. Prime Minister Yulian Révaý had resisted the Hungarians until then. In the night to 17 March, the last Czecho-Slovak troops left Khust and retreated to Romanian borders. They and the one-day president of Carpatho-Ukraine, Voloshyn, fled to Romania.

The Royal Hungarian Army continued their advance, pushing forward at top speed, and reached the Polish border on 17 March. Those Sich members who came from the province of Galicia as Polish citizens were captured by the Hungarians and handed over to Polish soldiers for illegally crossing the border, while some 500-600 were executed by Polish soldiers. The last resistance in the Carpathian mountains was taken out on 18 March.

The invasion campaign was a success, but it also proved that the Hungarian Army was not yet ready for full war. The handicaps imposed by the Trianon Treaty were clearly visible, but the morale and nationalist spirit of the soldiers and the civilian populations were high , which was also important in building a strong national army.

The Hungarian invasion was followed by a few weeks of terror in which more than 27,000 people were shot dead without trial and investigation.  Over 75,000 Ukrainians decided to seek asylum in the USSR; of those almost 60,000 are alleged to have died in Gulag prison-camps.

 World War II and aftermath 

In total between 1939 and 1944 80,000 Carpathian Ukrainians perished.

Following the German occupation of Hungary in March 1944, Adolf Eichmann oversaw the deportation of almost the entire Hungarian Jewish population; few survived the Holocaust. Control of Carpathian Ruthenia thus "nominally" reverted to Czechoslovakia. The delegation of the Czechoslovak government-in-exile, led by minister František Němec, arrived in Khust to establish the provisional Czechoslovak administration, according to the treaties between the Soviet and Czechoslovak government that year.

However, after just a few weeks, for reasons that remain unclear, the Red Army and the People's Commissariat for Internal Affairs started to obstruct the delegation's work and finally a puppet "National Committee of Transcarpatho-Ukraine" was set up in Mukachevo under the protection of the Red Army. On 26 November this committee, led by Ivan Ivanovich Turyanitsa, a Rusyn who had deserted from the Czechoslovak army, proclaimed the "will of Ukrainian people" to separate from Czechoslovakia and to join the Ukrainian Soviet Socialist Republic.

The Soviet Union exerted pressure on Czechoslovakia, and on 29 June 1945, the two countries signed a treaty, officially ceding Carpatho-Ruthenia to the USSR. In 1946, the area became part of the Ukrainian SSR as the Zakarpattia Oblast.

 Parliament 
It consisted of 32 representatives with 29 Ukrainians and three of national minorities.

At the session the parliament approved the proclamation of the sovereignty of Carpatho-Ukraine, adopted its Constitution, elected the president, and confirmed the new government of Julian Révaý. The head of the Soim became Augustin Štefan with his deputies, Fedir Révaý and Stepan Rosokha. The presidium of the Soim emigrated out of the country following the invasion of Carpatho-Ukraine by the Hungarian Armed Forces.

 Prosecution of Carpatho-Ukraine activists and government officials 
 Sevastian Sabol (1909–2003), a native of Presov and a surviving victim of Soviet and Hungarian prosecutions. During the Hungarian invasion of Carpatho-Ukraine in 1939, he was a chaplain in Carpathian Sich in Khust. On 16–18 December 1948, in Prague, Sabol was sentenced in absentia to life in prison for cooperation with the Ukrainian Insurgent Army.
 Avgustyn Voloshyn (1874–1945), died in a Soviet prison after being arrested in Prague by SMERSH in 1945

 See also 
 Slovak–Hungarian War
 Former countries in Europe after 1815
 Ruthenians and Ukrainians in Czechoslovakia (1918–1938)

 References 

 Bibliography 

 Ganzer, C. (2001). "Die Karpato-Ukraine 1938/39: Spielball im internationalen Interessenkonflikt am Vorabend des Zweiten Weltkrieges."  Hamburg. Die Ostreihe - Neue Folge. 
 Kotowski, A. S. (2001). '"Ukrainisches Piemont"? Die Karpartenukraine am Vorabend des Zweiten Weltkrieges.'  in Jahrbücher für Geschichte Osteuropas 49. pp. 67–95.
 
 Rosokha, S. (1949). Parliament of Carpatho-Ukraine.  Ukrainian National Publishing.
 
 Shandor, V. (1997). Carpatho-Ukraine in the Twentieth Century: A Political and Legal History. Cambridge: Harvard University Press. .
 Winch, M. (1939).  Republic for a day: An eye-witness account of the Carpatho-Ukraine incident. London.

 External links 
 Carpatho-Ukraine, Encyclopedia of Ukraine''

 
1939 in Ukraine
1939 establishments in Ukraine
1939 disestablishments in Ukraine
Former countries of the interwar period
Geographic history of Slovakia
Historical regions in Ukraine
History of Carpathian Ruthenia
Political history of Ukraine
States and territories established in 1939
States and territories disestablished in 1939
Territorial evolution of Hungary
Ukrainian independence movement
Former countries in Europe
Former republics